Alliance Girls' High School (AGHS) is a public national boarding school for girls located near the small town of Kikuyu in the Kiambu District of the Central Province of Kenya, 20 km from Nairobi. Founded in 1948 as the African Girls High School, it is within walking distance from its brother school Alliance High School.

History 
Founded in 1948 by the Alliance of Protestant Missions, Alliance Girls' High School was the first institution of higher secondary education for African girls in Kenya, and served in parallel with Kenya High School which at that time only admitted European girls. Before Kenyan independence it was called African Girls High School. Alliance Girls High School sits on 71 acres of land in Kiambu West district, Central Province, originally donated by the Presbyterian Church of East Africa.

The school's first principal, Jean Wilkinson (née Ewan), was a Scottish missionary. Joan Waithaka, one of the first students to graduate from the school, became its first African principal in 1969. She also served on the 1976 Gachathi Report committee which recommended that the Kenyan government adopt policies which would increase women's participation not only in higher education but also in science and other male-dominated spheres in the country.

The first 10 girls admitted to the school arrived on 28 February 1948 and came from all the different provinces in Kenya as is still the case today. In 1961, Alliance Girls High School was one of the first five schools in Africa to offer the Higher School Certificate (at the time, the equivalent of A Levels and a requirement for university entrance). Prior to the establishment of Alliance Girls High School, a few girls had been admitted to the predominantly male Alliance High School. One of the last girls to graduate from there was the writer Rebeka Njau who later taught at the Alliance Girls High School. The two schools continue to maintain close relations.

Principals 
Jean Wilkinson, 1948–54
Mary Bruce, 1955–1968
Joan Waithaka, 1969–1984
Rebecca Karanja, 1985–2002
V. M. Kituri, 2003–2004
J. N. Mbugua 2004–2008
Dorothy Kamwilu 2008–2016
Catherine K. Irungu (H.S.C) 2017
Virginia Gitonga 2017–present
Mrs Jedidah Mwangi - 2023 (current)

Academic reputation

The school has a reputation as a center of academic excellence in Kenya. It held first place amongst girls' schools in Kenya in the 2011 KCSE results and was in third place out of all Kenyan secondary schools. AGHS's graduates go on to leading Kenyan universities as well as international ones. Some of its students have also been selected to attend the African Leadership Academy.

Admission

Admission is highly competitive. Only students with a very high performance on the Kenya Certificate of Primary Education are selected to attend. The school also participates in the national quota system that sees a balance in admission of students from all Kenyan Districts. In 2015, Alliance Girls High School attracted the highest number of applicants out of all the national schools with 156,347 applications, followed by the Alliance High School with 154,417 and Mangu High School with 148,594.

School crest and colours
The school's crest is composed of a white torch yellow flame superimposed over St. Andrew's Cross on a green background. The initials AGHS are above the crest, while the school motto "Walk in the light" is beneath it, both written in yellow. According to the school's website, the colour yellow represents the light of the torch, the green depicts the life given by the light, and white signifies the product of this life. The school uniform is green reflecting the constant growth of the school.

For a few years, the school uniform was maroon in colour. This was phased out, beginning in the year 2005 with the form one class joining the school that year.

Chapel
The school chapel, one of the landmarks of the school, is located opposite the Administration block. It is used for services on Sunday, Tuesday and Thursday attended by all students. It is also where the school Barazas (student parliament and meetings) are held. The school chaplain is Reverend Dorcas Kamau who succeeded Reverend Marion Strain in 2011.

Notable alumnae 

Betty Gikonyo, medical entrepreneur, pediatric cardiologist and healthcare professional
Lucy Kibaki, former First Lady of Kenya
Sally Kosgei, first woman head of the Kenyan civil service
Micere Mugo, poet, writer and educator
Juliet Obanda Makanga, pharmacologist, neuroscientist and medical researcher
Nyiva Mwendwa, Kenya's first woman cabinet minister
Charity Ngilu, Kenya's first woman presidential candidate
Asenath Bole Odaga, publisher and author
Margaret Ogola, novelist and pediatrician
Effie Owuor, Kenya's first female judge
Kagure Wamunyu, civil engineer and urban planner
Charity Wayua, chemist and researcher

References

External links 
 www.alliancegirlshigh.sc.ke

Schools in Nairobi
High schools and secondary schools in Kenya
Education in Central Province (Kenya)
1948 establishments in Kenya
Educational institutions established in 1948
Girls' schools in Kenya
Women in Nairobi